In broadcasting, a commercial bumper, ident bumper, or break-bumper (often shortened to bump) is a brief announcement, usually two to fifteen seconds in length that can contain a voice over, placed between a pause in the program and its commercial break, and vice versa. The host, the program announcer, or a continuity announcer states the title (if any) of the presentation, the name of the program, and the broadcast or cable network, though not necessarily in that order. On children's television networks, they are sometimes called external eyecatches due to the resemblance of internal eyecatches in anime and there is usually no voice over, but some bumpers do feature one. Bumper music, often a recurring signature or theme music segment, is nearly always featured. Bumpers can vary from simple text to short films.

United States 
Since 1976, most network television programs in the United States no longer use commercial bumpers; although some soap operas such as Days of Our Lives (which stopped using one in 2010) and The Young and the Restless, as well as the game show The Price Is Right, still feature mid-show bumpers. Commercial bumpers are still a common feature of radio. In radio, they are often used during sports broadcasts to ease the transition from play by play to commercial break and back to live action, as well as notify local stations that they should insert their station identification and/or commercials, many times using obscure musical selections of the board operator's choosing. One example of commercial bumpers still in use can be found on Cartoon Network's late night programming block, Adult Swim, whose extensive usage of bumpers has even spawned its own website. Another example of commercial bumpers in radio was their use in syndicated programming; for instance, the radio countdown programs American Top 40 and American Country Countdown feature a series of pre-recorded jingles and other outcues to transition to and from commercial breaks.

During the late 1970s and early 1980s, in accordance with then-current regulations set by the Federal Communications Commission that required a distinction between programs and commercials, most children's programming bumpers would include the phrase "We'll be [right] back after these messages" (or variations of it), except for the bump before the final commercial break, which would usually say, "And now, these messages" (or variations of this phrase). The FCC significantly relaxed these rules in 1984, although to this day some networks still air these bumpers, particularly during programming that airs Sunday nights at 7 PM/6 PM Central that is not a news or information program such as 60 Minutes. Another common bumper phrase was "And now, a word from our sponsor."

Bumpers also had a technical reason for existence: Early videotape machines took several seconds to start playing video in proper synchronization with the program source.  The board operator would cue the tape with a "preroll" of several seconds then use the start of the bumper as a signal to start the tape before "taking" it at the bumper's end.  In the event of a glitch, the bumper was neither commercial nor programming content, and money would not be lost by the network or broadcaster.

United Kingdom 
In the United Kingdom, a break-bumper is a brief appearance of a logo before and after advertising breaks, usually that of the television channel being watched.

Break-bumpers can either be animated or static. They are sometimes branded to advertise a special programme or event that will be broadcast on that channel, such as sporting events.

Historically, break-bumpers within a programme were tied to the programme itself, often featuring an image from the show, a short extract from the show's theme tune, and a caption naming the show and containing words such as "End of Part 1" (at the start of a break) or "Part 2" (at the end of a break). Some channels will also include a secondary bumper, which appears between channel trailers (which usually book-end ad breaks) and the commercial adverts themselves. E4 from launch and for a long time afterwards would use each of these to display the appropriate half of a two-word phrase.

Australia 
In Australia, a break-bumper can be a brief appearance of a programme logo, animated logo, title card or an animated title card, just before an advertising break.

Break-bumpers can also be either animated or static information bars that appear for a few seconds, with program title and the logo of the television channel being watched. These are more often seen after a break and sometimes followed by information bars that show what programme is coming next or later.

Japan 
The term is used, in Japan, to refer to all kinds of bumpers.

In many television series, eyecatches are contemporaneous into the climax of a story, leading onto speculation during the commercial break.

Unlike in American programs, in which bumpers are typically supplied by the network (when they have them at all), eyecatches are almost always produced by the production company and considered a part of the program itself, rather than (or also serving as) a segue into a commercial break. They are typically two to six seconds in length. Eyecatches for children's programs are often longer and more elaborate, while eyecatches for programming intended for adults may consist of nothing more than the program's logo against a black background.

The term is used in the title of the 1991 Japanese film Eyecatch Junction.

Malaysia 
In the 1990s, commercial bumpers were used by terrestrial television networks. Similar to those in the United Kingdom, it is a short appearance of a logo or a slide to remind the viewers of the programme being aired, which appears before or after breaks. The logo is usually that of the television channel or station being watched and/or of the programme's title. However, as the years passed on until the late 2000s, this changed to feature a message that the programme will return after the break ends, which is now more commonly seen on RTM's TV1 and TV2 and Media Prima's NTV7, 8TV and TV9. TV3 also uses this for sponsored programmes, but as of 2013, it also uses them for non-sponsored programs, such as children's programmes. The 1990s bumper style, however, is sometimes used sparingly.

Since 2003, nearly all of Astro's satellite television channels feature break bumpers that are placed before and after breaks. These bumpers consist of the logo of the aforementioned channels, as well as a slide promoting the current programme being broadcast and the next programme scheduled to air. Bumpers based on the subscription information sequence seen at the end of Astro Box Office promotional trailers from 2003 to 2006, appear in-between commercials and immediately before the program break ends, but not at the beginning of the block of replaced commercials.

Philippines 
In the Philippines, one notable example of a television network that use break bumpers is ABS-CBN. From March 1, 1987 to October 30, 2005, its break bumper featured the stars zooming in on a black background, based on the Star Network era. This was the longest break bumper to be used by the network since its relaunch in 1986, being used for 18 years. In October 31, 2005, five years after the 2000 ABS-CBN logo was unveiled, the 1987 break bumper was replaced with the one that takes place on a blue background, with the network's 2000 logo appearing on a screen and when it zooms out, it places on a box or crystal plane and then the logo zooms in. The 2005 break bumper was used until February 4, 2014. On February 5, 2014, due to the introduction of the network's 2014 and current logo, the break bumper was again changed, this time taking place on a white background, with the 2014 ABS-CBN logo appearing on a screen, red, green and blue strings representing the colors of the network's logo appear while the logo is being zoomed out, and it zooms in. These bumpers last for 2 seconds and are played after the commercial, but from late 2014 until May 5, 2020, the 2014 break bumper can either be played after the title card that shows when the program pauses or after the advertisements. From June 13, 2016 to May 5, 2020, the 2014 bumper is shown in widescreen or letterboxed format, making the first break bumper to be in 16:9 aspect ratio.

The break bumper of Kapamilya Channel (replacement of the main ABS-CBN terrestrial network), however, displays the ABS-CBN logo on the screen and colors it with red, green, blue, and black. The rings will then zoom in, and the Kapamilya Channel logo will display and replace the ABS-CBN logo. ABS-CBN rings will then use as background once the Kapamilya Channel logo appears and the logo will zoom in along with the rings. It lasts for 5 seconds unlike with the break bumper used by the main ABS-CBN terrestrial network which only lasts for 2 seconds, and may be used after the title card that shows when the program pauses like with the 2014 break bumper of ABS-CBN main terrestrial network from late 2014 to May 5, 2020. Its ABS-CBN logo portion may also be seen on some other ABS-CBN-owned TV channels and channels that broadcast ABS-CBN shows, such as on TeleRadyo (i.e. between TV Patrol title card and commercial breaks) and A2Z (between the title card of a show and "You're Watching" bumper).

Upon airing of ASAP Natin 'To, FPJ: Da King (since January 24, 2021), and the network's Primetime Bida shows (since March 8, 2021, as part of TodoMax Primetime Singko) on TV5, show-exclusive break bumpers of ABS-CBN Entertainment were introduced on A2Z and TV5 where either the respective show's characters, elements related to the show and parts of the show's logo are shown during the duration of the bumper or simply show the ABS-CBN Entertainment logo and show's logo upon airing of the show-exclusive bumper. At the end of each bumper, either the show's logo and ABS-CBN Entertainment logos or simply the logo of the show appears and after they appear, either an object related to the show, show's logo, logo of the show and its characters, or both the show logo and ABS-CBN Entertainment logo zoom in. The length of a break bumper lasts for 5 seconds like the Kapamilya Channel break bumper. Like with the break bumpers of the main ABS-CBN terrestrial network from March 1, 1987 to May 5, 2020 and Kapamilya Channel, they do not have a music or sound at all. Some bumpers such as FPJ: Da King, Walang Hanggang Paalam, and Huwag Kang Mangamba zoom in in a right-slant fashion like the Kapamilya Channel bumper, while others zooms in a straightforward manner like the 2014–2020 break bumper of main ABS-CBN terrestrial network such as Ang Probinsyano and Marry Me, Marry You. Break bumpers of foreign television series and some drama series on TV5 and A2Z that also air on Kapamilya Channel (i.e. Count Your Lucky Stars, FPJ: Da King, and Init sa Magdamag) does not have the ABS-CBN Entertainment logo above the show's logo.

Poland 
In Poland, television networks usually separate the rest of the programming with the word "Reklama" ("Commercial"). One of the examples are TVP's ones: First one was used since 1989 until 1990 and it consisted an ad agency's logo (eye in a form of letter S) in a black background with indigo 3D stars. Second one was used until 1992, which consisted newer ad agency logo (Loop in a form of during this time acronym (TP) with a ball) and a word "REKLAMA" in lower left corner in a black (until 1991 blue) background. Third one was used in early 1992 and it was a laser smashing a metal ball, in which later rotating 'REKLAMA' appears and in the same year, later version appeared, in which squares (or diagonal stripes, depending on channel) rotated the same word (and the same font) as previous. This one was used until launch of 1995 one (Inspired by gyroscope), in which was used until 1997. Later, in the late 1990s, these bumpers were used, depending on era, but had one thing: word in a ball (except July–August 1999, in which a "Meandres" series was used). Since 2000 (except 2012-2015, in which were was in both channels, inspired by kaleidoscope), graphics are now separated, and TVP1 since 2010 with newer graphic technologies, (TVP2 has the same since 2007), formerly, they had inspired by art (TVP1 - 2000-2010, TVP2 - 2000-2007), or by real-life ones (TVP1 had two bumpers inspired with it in which first ones was used for short period in 2010, second ones was used until 2012, TVP2 also had ones from the same era, but in a colors: Blue (in Winter) or purple (other seasons) and Orange, the same technique is used in branding from 2015 to 2021, but in all colors). Polsat, the first commercial TV Channel in Poland, used following bumpers:

1992-1994: Rotating spiral from Polsat's 1992 logo with REKLAMA text under it.

1994-1996: Rotating stripes forming a background and, appearing later, REKLAMA text. There were two variants: Blue-silver and pink-gold.

1996-1998: The sun emerges partially (upper part seen) from golden liquid and REKLAMA text (blue, with Arial font) appears on the lower left corner. On the end of ad break, it's the reversed situation.

1998 Easter: A chick runs on blue background, forming REKLAMA text. At the end of block, chick returns to previous place, removing colo(u)rful text.

1998-2001: "reklama" text repeated thrice, each one in different size, on white-indigo background.

Russia 
In Russia, networks like Channel One and Russia-1 use the commercial bumpers as they appear as a one-off bumper. Channel One used the commercial idents from November 2004 to 31 August 2011 , As they started to use the short-lived commercial ident package called "The Four Seasons" which ran thru 1 September 2011 to 31 August 2012 , In these commercial idents the music was actually mostly classical with piano and violins, As they started to use the current commercial ident package "Clocks" which featured three separate piano pieces "Morning" (September 2012 to September 2013) and the popular "Noon" (which is the one that is the current piano piece should be used to this day) and "Night" (which they have started to use in 2016) they also used the 3-note piece as their three commercial idents debuted in 2012 and used the 3-note piece. In the international versions of these idents, they have used the information about to suggest a commercial. But networks like NTV use the commercial idents as an intro and outro idents. One of the famous commercial ident from NTV is the "Rectangle on the NTV" which has been used as an ident thru 6 September 1998 to 31 May 2001. Which in these idents feature the NTV logo being in a rectangle-shaped scope. At the beginning of each idents, the reminiscent of the commercial idents from 1996 or 1994. In the end of the commercials, flag and a part of the ident is shown. Another one is the short-lived one used from 1 June to 8 September 2001. Which in these commercial idents show the metal soviet pieces from the 1980s and 1990s. Basically new year idents of Channel One are always festive. starting with 1995 when the famous things of Christmas should be shown like Santa Claus and Christmas Tree and especially Spasskaya Tower. 1996 shouldn't have a festive offering but logo is in snow. Starting with 1997, new year commercial idents are born. First of them would be the one with a snowman doing something weird. These commercial idents are run from 24 December 1997 to 11 January 1998. Some of the most memorable new year commercial idents from Channel One we're the 2008 one, which features a Christmas tree with cards being animated. This one was run thru 22 December 2008 to 11 January 2009 and returned on 21 December 2009 to 10 January 2010. The 2010 one had an inspiration from A Trip to the Moon featured a rocket's adventures in Moscow. For some reason the commercial idents did not have the word "реклама" when it was uploaded to Vimeo. Actually the TV version did have the word "реклама". This ran from 20 December 2010 to 10 January 2011. But the Channel One had brought back the 2008 one in December 2011, the only difference is that the scope is now in 16:9. The 2008 ident had been repeated in 2012 and 2013.

In other countries 
In Argentina, since around September 2010, it is compulsory for almost all broadcasters to use a commercial bumper, using the words "Espacio publicitario" (Commercial break) to separate the rest of the programme from the advertisements.

In German-speaking countries, the word "Werbung" (Advertisement) is used; in Switzerland, this word is also used in different languages: French: Publicité or Pub in short; Italian: Pubblicità. The same goes for France and Italy, but only second and third ones are written, respectively.

Bumpers on children's television

Bumpers or external eyecatches on children's television networks, and sometimes other networks, are similar to the internal eyecatches used in Japanese anime, with the difference being that the bumpers are supplied by the network. These usually appear only at the end of commercial breaks, but sometimes leading into the start of the break as well. Their primary purpose is to alert children that the commercial break has ended. Depending on the network, the bumper may or may not feature a voice over.

Often, these eyecatches have a secondary purpose: marketing. For example, cable network Nickelodeon uses them to help children learn to identify the network and thus increase brand awareness. Most children's television networks run these bumpers because of this reason. From the mid-1980s to the early 1990s periods, (in conjunction with branding firm Fred/Alan, Inc.), the network created 225 bumpers, some featuring catchy disco jingles recorded by a cappella group The Jive Five.

See also 
Promo (media)

References 

Television terminology
Interstitial television shows
Broadcasting
Television presentation
Anime and manga terminology